Dion Pellerin (born March 11, 1998) is a professional Canadian football fullback who is free agent. He most recently played for the Toronto Argonauts of the Canadian Football League (CFL).

University career
Pellerin played U Sports football for the Waterloo Warriors from 2016 to 2019. He played in 32 regular season games where he had 2,304 rushing yards and 20 touchdowns, including 977 yards and 11 touchdowns in his senior year.

Professional career
Pellerin was drafted in the fifth round, 42nd overall, in the 2020 CFL Draft by the Toronto Argonauts, but did not play in 2020 due to the cancellation of the 2020 CFL season. It was then announced that he had signed his rookie contract with the Argonauts on March 22, 2021. Following training camp, he made the team's active roster for 2021 and played in his first career professional game on August 7, 2021, against the Calgary Stampeders where he had one special teams tackle. He had his first career reception on October 30, 2021, against the BC Lions where he also caught the game-winning two-point conversion in overtime, which were the first points scored of his professional career. He played in 14 games where he had two receptions for 11 yards and four special teams tackles. In the following year, he was released with the final training camp cuts on June 5, 2022.

Personal life
Pellerin was born in Abbotsford, British Columbia to parents Karen Brown and David Pellerin. His father was a Regina native and fan of the Saskatchewan Roughriders and died when Pellerin was 16 years old.

References

External links
Toronto Argonauts bio

1997 births
Living people
Canadian football fullbacks
Players of Canadian football from British Columbia
Sportspeople from Abbotsford, British Columbia
Toronto Argonauts players
Waterloo Warriors football players